March Air Reserve Base  (March ARB), previously known as March Air Force Base (March AFB) is located in Riverside County, California between the cities of Riverside, Moreno Valley, and Perris. It is the home to the Air Force Reserve Command's Fourth Air Force (4 AF) Headquarters and the host 452d Air Mobility Wing (452 AMW), the largest air mobility wing of the Fourth Air Force. In addition to multiple units of the Air Force Reserve Command supporting Air Mobility Command, Air Combat Command and Pacific Air Forces, March ARB is also home to units from the Army Reserve, Navy Reserve, Marine Corps Reserve, California Air National Guard and the California Army National Guard. For almost 50 years, March AFB was a Strategic Air Command base during the Cold War.

Units

On 1 January 1994, the 722d Air Refueling Wing was activated at then-March AFB to replace the 22d Air Refueling Wing, which was moving to McConnell AFB, KS, w/o/p/e. The wing was inactivated On 1 April 1996, and base responsibilities transferred to Air Force Reserve 452d Air Mobility Wing (452 AMW).

Today the host unit at March remains the 452 AMW, which in addition to its operational flying mission, also provides host base support for numerous tenant units. March JARB is also the home to Headquarters, Fourth Air Force (4 AF) of the Air Force Reserve Command and multiple units of the California Air National Guard.
 452d Air Mobility Wing
 452d Operations Group
 336th Air Refueling Squadron
 729th Airlift Squadron
 452d Operations Support Squadron        
 912th Air Refueling Squadron (Active Duty "Associate" Squadron)
 452d Maintenance Group
 452d Mission Support Group
 452d Medical Group
 1st Combat Camera Squadron Operating Location Charlie (established late 2017)

Tenant units
 Fourth Air Force
 163d Attack Wing, California Air National Guard
 144th Fighter Wing Detachment 1, California Air National Guard
 701st Combat Operations Squadron, 610th Air Operations Group, Tenth Air Force
 362d Air Force Recruiting Squadron, 372d Recruiting Group, Air Force Recruiting Service
 AFN Broadcast Center/Defense Media Center
 Defense Visual Information Center, Defense Media Activity
 653d Area Support Group, Army Reserve Center
 304th Sustainment Brigade
 358th Civil Affairs Brigade, 351st Civil Affairs Command, United States Army Civil Affairs and Psychological Operations Command
 Naval and Marine Corps Reserve Center
 Air and Marine Operations Center, CBP Air and Marine Operations
 Civil Air Patrol, California Wing, Inland Empire Group III, 45th Composite Squadron
 Defense Commissary Agency
 Army & Air Force Exchange Service
 March Joint Powers Authority

Since 1995, March ARB has hosted alert site operations of the California Air National Guard's 144th Fighter Wing (144 FW), which is also operationally-gained by Air Combat Command. Prior to 2013, the 144 FW stationed F-16 Fighting Falcon aircraft, initially consisting of F-16C/D Block 25, then F-16C/D Block 32, on alert at March. Following the wing's transition to the F-15 Eagle, the 144 FW now stations contracted South Dakota ANG (114th FW) F-16C Block 30s at this operating location in support of USNORTHCOM and NORAD.

Civilian agency flight activities include a permanently based U.S. Customs and Border Protection Air Unit, as well as a California Department of Forestry air unit that uses the base on an intermittent basis.

Dragon Flight is a civilian formation flight demonstration team, based at March, sponsored by the March Field Aero Club. The team uses the T-34 Mentor, making numerous appearances throughout the southwest United States each year.

March Field Airfest
The March Field Airfest, also known as Thunder Over the Empire, is a biennial air show held at March ARB. It is among the largest events in the Inland Empire and Riverside County. The show has featured such performers as the United States Air Force Thunderbirds, the F-22 Raptor and many other military and civilian demonstrations. 2010 saw the Patriots Jet Team as the highlight demonstration team of the show. Attendance for the 2010 show was estimated at over 150,000. Next air show is scheduled for April 22–23, 2023.

History
March is one of the oldest airfields operated by the United States military, being established as Alessandro Flying Training Field in February 1918. It was one of thirty-two Air Service training camps established after the United States entry into World War I in April 1917. The airfield was renamed March Field the following month for 2d Lieutenant Peyton C. March, Jr., the recently deceased son of then-Army Chief of Staff Peyton C. March, who was killed in an air crash in Texas just fifteen days after being commissioned.

World War I
The establishment of March Air Force Base began in the early 20th century at a time when the United States was rushing to build up its military forces in anticipation of an entry into World War I. In 1917, in response to news from the front lines, Congressional appropriations attempted to back the plans of General George O. Squier, the Army's chief signal officer, to "put the Yankee punch into the war by building an army in the air".

At the same time, the War Department announced its intentions to build several new military installations. Efforts by Frank Miller, then owner of the Mission Inn in Riverside, California, Hiram Johnson and others, succeeded in gaining War Department approval to construct an airfield at Alessandro Field located near Riverside, an airstrip used by aviators from Rockwell Field on cross-country flights from San Diego.

The Army quickly set about establishing the new air field. Sergeant Charles E. Garlick, who had landed at Alessandro Field in a Curtiss JN-4 "Jenny" in November 1917, was selected to lead the advance contingent of four men to the new base from Rockwell Field. On 26 February 1918, Garlick and his crew and a group of muleskinners from nearby Colton, known to be experts in clearing land as well as for their colorful syntax, began the task of excavating the building foundations, and on 1 March 1918, Alessandro Flying Training Field was opened.

On 20 March 1918, Alessandro Flying Training Field became March Field, named in honor of Second Lieutenant Peyton C. March, Jr., son of the Army Chief of Staff, who had been killed when his Curtiss JN-4 "Jenny" crashed in Fort Worth, Texas the previous month. His crash occurred two weeks after he had been commissioned in the regular United States Army Air Service.

By late April 1918, enough progress had been made in the construction of the new field to allow the arrival of the first troops. The commander of the 818th Aero Squadron detachment, Captain William Carruthers, took over as the field's first commander and for a time operated out of an office in the Mission Inn. Within a record 60 days, the grain stubble-covered plain of Moreno Valley had been partially transformed to include twelve hangars, six barracks equipped for 150 men each, mess halls, a machine shop, post exchange, hospital, a supply depot, an aero repair building, bachelor officer's quarters and a residence for the commanding officer. Eventually March Field saw the construction of some 50 buildings. It covered over 700 acres and could accommodate up to 1,000 personnel. Dozens of wooden buildings served as headquarters, maintenance, and officers' quarters. Enlisted men had to bivouac in tents.

The first flying squadron was the 215th Aero Squadron, which was transferred from Rockwell Field, North Island, California. Later the 68th and the 289th were also transferred up from Rockwell. Only a few U.S. Army Air Service aircraft arrived with squadrons, most of the Curtiss JN-4 Jennys to be used for flight training were shipped in wooden crates by railcar.

March Field served as a base for primary flight training with an eight-week course. It could accommodate a maximum of 300 students. In 1918, flight training occurred in two phases: primary and advanced. Primary training consisted of pilots learning basic flight skills under dual and solo instruction. After completion of their primary training at Mather, flight cadets were then transferred to another base for advanced training. Training units assigned to March were:
 Post Headquarters, March Field, March 1918 – April 1923
 68th Aero Squadron (II), June 1918 (transferred from Rockwell Field, California)
 Re-designated as Squadron "A", July–November 1918
 215th Aero Squadron, March 1918 (transferred from Rockwell Field, California)
 Re-designated as Squadron "B", July–November 1918
 289th Aero Squadron, August 1918 (transferred from Rockwell Field, California)
 Re-designated as Squadron "C", July–November 1918
 293d Aero Squadron, June 1918
 Re-designated as Squadron "D", July–November 1918
 311th Aero Squadron, June 1918
 Re-designated as Squadron "E", July–November 1918
 Flying School Detachment (Consolidation of Squadrons A-E), November 1918 – November 1919

First accident
On 2 August 1918, Standard J-1, AS-1918, crashed and was written off at March Field. "By Associated Press to The Sun Riverside, Aug. 2. – William L. Ash, flying cadet at March field [sic], fell 1,000 feet in a tail spin today and was seriously injured. He suffered a fractured leg and arm and puncture of the side. It is expected he will recover. Ash lived in Pittsburg, Kansas. It was the first serious accident at March field. Ash was making his second solo flight when he fell."

Post-Armistice
With the sudden end of World War I on 11 November 1918, the future operational status of March Field was unknown. Many local officials speculated that the U.S. government would keep the field open because of the outstanding combat record established by March-trained pilots in Europe. Locals also pointed to the optimal weather conditions in the Riverside area for flight training. Cadets in flight training on 11 November 1918 were allowed to complete their training, however no new cadets were assigned to the base. Also the separate training squadrons were consolidated into a single Flying School detachment, as many of the personnel assigned were being demobilized.

Inter-war years

The signing of the armistice in November 1918 did not halt training at March Field. Initially March was used by several Air Service squadrons that returned from France:
 9th Aero Squadron: 22 July – 2 August, 15 November – 11 December 1919
 19th Aero Squadron: 1 October – 29 June 1921
 23rd Aero Squadron: 1 October 1921 – 21 March 1922

On 13 December 1919, the United States House of Representatives passed an appropriations bill for $9.6 million for the purchase of additional land at military camps “which are to be made part of the permanent military establishment.” March Field was allocated $64,000 of this amount.

However, by 1921, the decision had been made to phase down all activities at the base in accordance with sharply reduced military budgets. By the spring of 1923, March Field was deactivated as an active duty airfield, however, and a small caretaker unit was assigned to the facility for administrative reasons. It was used by the aerial forestry patrol. It also was used intermittently to support small military units.

March Field remained quiet for only a short time. In July 1926, Congress created the Army Air Corps and approved the Army's five-year plan which called for an expansion in pilot training and the activation of tactical units. Accordingly, funds were appropriated for the reopening of March Field in March 1927.

Colonel William C. Gardenhire, assigned to direct the refurbishment of the base, had just directed his crews to replace underpinnings of many of the previous buildings when he received word the future construction would be in Spanish Mission architectural design. In time, March Field would receive permanent structures. The rehabilitation effort was nearly complete in August 1927, when Major Millard F. Harmon reported in to take over the job of base commander and commandant of the flying school. Classes began shortly after his arrival. The 13th School Group and its 47th and 53rd School Squadrons provided primary and basic flying training for future Air Force leaders such as Hoyt Vandenberg, Nathan Twining, Thomas Power and Curtis LeMay.

As March Field began to take on the appearance of a permanent military installation, the base's basic mission changed. When Randolph Field began to function as a training site in 1931, March Field became an operational base. Before the end of the year, the 7th Bombardment Group, commanded by Major Carl A. Spaatz, brought its Curtiss B-2 Condor and Keystone B-3A bombers to the airfield. The activation of the 17th Pursuit Group and several subordinate units along with the arrival of the 1st Bombardment Wing initiated a period where March Field became associated with the Air Corps' heaviest aircraft as well as an assortment of fighters. Aircraft on March's flightline in the 1930s included Keystone B-4, Martin B-10/B-12 and Douglas B-18 Bolo bombers; Boeing P-12, P-26 Peashooter, and Curtiss P-36 Hawk pursuit aircraft; Northrop A-17A dive bombers and Douglas O-38 observation aircraft.

In the decade before World War II, March Field took on much of its current appearance and also began to gain prominence. Lieutenant Colonel Henry H. (Hap) Arnold, base commander from 1931 to 1936, began a series of well-publicized maneuvers to gain public attention. This resulted in a visit by Governor James Rolph in March 1932, numerous visits by Hollywood celebrities including Bebe Daniels, Wallace Beery, Rochelle Hudson and others, and visits by famous aviators including Amelia Earhart. Articles in Los Angeles newspapers also kept March Field in the news and brought to it considerable public attention.

Beginning in April 1933, hundreds of Civilian Conservation Corps (C.C.C.) recruits began arriving at March Field every day. They totaled over 7000 by July of that year. They were housed in tent camps while waiting for permanent facilities to be constructed. That summer, at the direction of Malin Craig, Air Corps activities at the field were essentially placed on hold while the C.C.C. program got under way, under Hap Arnold's direct oversight.

The completion of the first phase of permanent buildings in 1934 added to the scenic quality of the base.

World War II

The Attack on Pearl Harbor in December 1941 quickly brought March Field back into the business of training aircrews. Throughout World War II, many soon-to-be-famous bombardment groups performed their final training at March before embarking for duty in the Pacific. Known sub-bases and auxiliaries used for training were:
 Buffalo Springs Airport 
 Needles Army Airfield 
 Shavers Summit Army Airfield 

On a lighter note, entertainer Bob Hope's first USO show was held at March on 6 May 1941. He had been asked to do this show on location by his radio producer Albert Capstaff, whose brother was stationed there. Jack Benny later originated his own radio program from March Field on 11 January 1942.

Postwar era

Tactical Air Command
After the war, March was assigned to the new Tactical Air Command (TAC) as part of the postwar reorganization of the Army Air Force. March was allocated to TAC's Twelfth Air Force. The first TAC unit to be assigned was the 1st Fighter Group, under the command of Colonel Frank S. Perego, being reactivated at March on 3 July 1946, replacing and absorbing the assets of the wartime 412th Fighter Group. At the time of its activation, the group's three squadrons (the 27th, 71st, and 94th Fighter Squadrons) flew Lockheed P-80 Shooting Star (after 11 June 1948 F-80), America's first operational jet fighter.

Few members of the 1st Fighter Group foresaw subsequent difficulties in the summer of 1946 as they trained with their new jet fighters. The 412th had reported in the summer of 1945 that the P-80 would be well suited for bomber escort, counterair, and ground support. The 1st Fighter Group trained for these and other possible strategic and tactical missions. Pilot inexperience and mechanical difficulties combined to give the P-80 a high accident rate, while parts shortages curtailed operational training. Even so, the 1st Fighter Group maintained a heavy schedule of demonstration flights that served to introduce the fighter to a curious public.

On 15 August 1947, the 1st Fighter Wing was activated as part of AAF Regulation 20-15, "Reorganization of AAF Base Units and Installations," on 27 June 1947. This regulation, which laid out what became known as the Hobson Plan, prescribed a standard organizational setup for all Army Air Force bases worldwide. In 1947, the 67th Tactical Reconnaissance Group (later Wing) was activated as part of a service-wide, wing-base test and assigned to March. When the wing was activated, only the 67th Reconnaissance Group was fully operational. The group was equipped with FA-26 Invaders (RB-26 after 1948) and Lockheed FP-80s (RF-80s after 1948) and was integrated with the 1st Fighter Wing, performing a wide array of day and night photographic missions in southern California. Budget constraints, though, resulted in the wing's inactivation in March 1949.

Continental Air Command
In December 1948, Twelfth Air Force and March AFB were assigned from Tactical Air Command to Continental Air Command (ConAC), established on 1 December 1948. ConAC assumed jurisdiction over both TAC and the Air Defense Command (ADC). This move reflected an effort to concentrate all fighter forces deployed within the continental United States to strengthen the air defense of the North American continent.

The creation of ConAC was largely an administrative convenience: the units assigned to ConAC were dual-trained and expected to revert to their primary strategic or tactical roles after the air defense battle was won. The 1st Fighter Wing was subsequently transferred from Twelfth Air Force/TAC to Fourth Air Force/ ConAC on 20 December 1948. The first F-86As, assigned to the 94th Fighter Squadron, arrived on 15 February 1949. By the end of June the wing had received seventy-nine of its eighty-three authorized F-86s.

Strategic Air Command
On 1 May 1949, March became a part of the Strategic Air Command (SAC) and the Fifteenth Air Force (15AF). On 10 May, the 22d Bombardment Wing (22 BW) was reassigned to March from Smoky Hill Air Force Base, Kansas. The 22d was equipped with the Boeing B-29 Superfortress. The 1st Fighter Wing was subsequently attached to the 22 BW on 1 July as the 22d Wing's headquarters was initially non-operational and its operational components were detached so it shared a commander with the 1st Fighter Wing. The 22d Bomb Wing became operational on 1 May 1949 and the 1st Fighter Wing was attached to it with both wings sharing the same commanding officer.

The new F-86A fighter developed numerous teething troubles during its first months of service, but 1st Fighter Group mechanics gradually overcame these difficulties. When the squadrons found themselves able to launch large formations on schedule, they competed to establish various formation records. The purpose of this exercise became clear in early January 1950, when the 1st Fighter Group deployed a sizable contingent of aircraft to participate in the filming of the RKO Pictures film Jet Pilot. The group claimed a final formation record on 4 January when it passed a twenty-four plane formation (consisting of eight aircraft from each squadron) "before the cameras." (Note: The film was not released to theaters until October 1957, by which time the F-86A was obsolete).

The 1st Fighter Group formed its own aerial demonstration team in January 1950. The team, dubbed the "Sabre Dancers," was composed of five members of the 27th Fighter Squadron. The Sabre Dancers made what was probably their most widely viewed flight on 22 April 1950, when they performed before an Armed Forces Day audience at Eglin AFB, Florida, that included President Harry S. Truman, most of his Cabinet, and numerous other political leaders.

On 16 April 1950, the 1st Fighter Wing was redesignated as the 1st Fighter-Interceptor Wing. On 30 June 1950, the 1st Fighter-Interceptor Group was assigned to the 1st Fighter-Interceptor Wing, which was itself assigned to Fifteenth Air Force and SAC. On 1 July the wing was relieved from assignment to Fifteenth Air Force and SAC and assigned to the Fourth Air Force and ConAC. Two days later the wing issued orders establishing advanced parties of its headquarters and component organizations at Victorville (later George) AFB, California. The wing made its permanent change of station move to Victorville on 18 July.

Korean War
Detached from the wing, the 22d Bombardment Group deployed its B-29s in early July 1950 to Kadena AB, Okinawa, where it came under control of FEAF Bomber Command (Provisional). On 13 July, the group flew its first mission, against the marshaling yards and oil refinery at Wonsan, North Korea. By 21 October, it had amassed fifty-seven missions against the enemy, attacking bridges, factories, industrial targets, troop concentrations, airfields, marshaling yards, communications centers, and port facilities. During four months of combat in the Korean War, the group flew 335 sorties with only fourteen aborts and dropped over 6,500 tons of bombs. It redeployed to the United States in late October and November 1950.

On 2 January 1951, the 44th Bombardment Wing was activated and assigned to Fifteenth Air Force. It was equipped with refurbished B-29 and TB-29 bombers drawn from mothballed World War II storage at Pyote AFB in Texas and Davis-Monthan AFB in Arizona. It was reassigned to the 12th Air Division of Fifteenth Air Force on 10 February 1951, and then the 21st Air Division within Fifteenth Air Force on 4 August 1951. The Wing moved to Lake Charles Air Force Station, Louisiana, on 1 August 1951.

On 28 March 1951, the California Air National Guard 106th Bombardment Group was activated to federal service at March and put on active duty. The group was initially equipped with refurbished B-29s and its mission was to train reservists to backfill rotating B-29 combat crews serving in Korea. While the reservists were undergoing training they were paid on the lesser reserve pay scale. The group was redesignated as the 320th Bombardment Wing replacing the 106th in December 1952. At March, the wing conducted global bombardment training and air refueling operations to meet SAC commitments. Trained B-47 cadre for 96th Bombardment Wing, Medium, December 1953 – January 1955. Deployed as a wing to RAF Brize Norton, England, 5 June – 4 September 1954, and Andersen AFB, Guam, 5 October 1956 – 11 January 1957. The 320th was inactivated on 15 December 1960. Also during the Korean War, the Air Force Reserve 330th Bombardment Group was ordered to active duty on 1 May 1951 at March. The 330th flew borrowed B-29s from the 106th Bomb Group to train the reservists on the aircraft. The group was inactivated on 16 June and its personnel were sent to bases in Japan and Okinawa as replacements for active-duty personnel with B-29 groups.

Cold War
Following the return of the 22d Bombardment Group from Korea, the wing trained for proficiency in global strategic bombardment, and in 1952, the wing took delivery of Boeing KC-97 tankers, adding aerial refueling to its mission. The following year, the wing retired its B-29 fleet and replaced them with the jet-powered Boeing B-47 "Stratojet." In 1957, 22d Wing aircrews flew the longest non-stop mass flight in history:  from England to California. General Archie Old, the Fifteenth Air Force commander, led a flight of three B-52 Stratofortresses in a flight around the world. The wing deployed to RAF Upper Heyford, England from December 1953 to March 1954.

In 1960, the 452d Troop Carrier Wing was activated at March. This established the presence of the Air Force Reserve on the base with their Fairchild C-119 Flying Boxcars. The wing was not tactically operational from 11 March to 15 September 1963, while the 2nd Bombardment Squadron converted to Boeing B-52B bombers and KC-135 jet tankers replaced the KC-97s. In 1966, the 2d Bomb Squadron converted to the B-52D and gained a commitment to forward deploy to the Pacific and engage in combat during the Vietnam War. In 1966, the wing absorbed the B-52Ds and added the 486th Bombardment Squadron from the inactivating 340th Bombardment Wing at Bergstrom Air Force Base, Texas when Bergstrom converted to a TAC fighter/reconnaissance base. The addition of a second tanker and bomber squadron made the 22d a "Super" wing.

Vietnam War
From March to October 1967 the 22d wing was reduced to a small "rear-echelon" non-tactical organization with all tactical resources and most support resources loaned to SAC organizations involved in combat operations in Southeast Asia from U-Tapao, Thailand and Andersen AFB, Guam.

The wing continued to support SAC operations in the Far East and Southeast Asia through 1975, and from April 1972 to October 1973 the wing again had all its bomber resources loaned to other organizations for combat and contingency operations. Its KC-135 resources were also on loan from April to September 1972; afterwards, a few tankers returned to wing control.

Refueling mission
The 22d maintained a strategic bombardment alert posture from 1973–1982, but in 1978 it added conventional warfare missions, including mine-laying and sea reconnaissance/surveillance. After the retirement of the B-52D in 1982, the 22d Bombardment Wing was renamed the 22d Air Refueling Wing and re-equipped with new KC-10A Extenders (based on the DC-10 airliner), making the 22d the third Air Force unit to operate the giant new tankers, behind Barksdale and Seymour Johnson AFBs. Two months later, the wing lost its bomber mission and became the 22d Air Refueling Wing.

The 22d used the KC-10A's cargo, passenger, and fuel load capacity to provide support during the evacuation of U.S. nationals as part of the invasion of Grenada in 1983. In December 1989, the wing's 22d Air Refueling Squadron inactivated and all its KC-135A Stratotankers were retired or transferred to other SAC bases. This left the KC-10-equipped 6th and 9th ARS as the wing's only flying squadrons. The base was listed on the National Priorities List as a Superfund site on 21 November 1989.

Post-Cold War era
In July 1990, the 163d Tactical Fighter Group changed missions and was re-designated the 163rd Tactical Reconnaissance Group, equipped with RF-4C Phantom II aircraft. The 22 ARW supported F-117 deployments to Saudi Arabia and contributed aircraft and personnel to logistics efforts in support of the liberation of Kuwait from 1990–1991. On 1 June 1992, a major Air Force reorganization resulted in the disestablishment of the Strategic Air Command. The 22d ARW was assigned to the new Air Mobility Command, and from the end of 1992 to 1994, the wing flew humanitarian airlift missions to Somalia. It also provided air refueling in support of deployments to Haiti in 1994.

Air Force Reserve

In March 1993, March was chosen for realignment under the Base Realignment and Closure [BRAC] III with an effective date of 31 March 1996. In August 1993, the 445th Military Airlift Wing transferred to March from the closing Norton AFB in nearby San Bernardino. On 3 January 1994, the 22d Air Refueling Wing was reassigned without aircraft to McConnell AFB, Kansas, replacing the inactivating 384th Bomb Wing. The Air Mobility Command's 722d Air Refueling Wing stood up at March and absorbed the assets of the reassigned 22d. March's KC-10A aircraft assets would later be transferred to the 60th Airlift Wing, redesignated as the 60th Air Mobility Wing, at Travis AFB, California.

Due to realignment, the 445th Military Airlift Wing was transferred to the 452d Air Refueling Wing operating the KC-135 Stratotanker which was redesignated the 452d Air Mobility Wing (452 AMW) on 1 April 1994. At approximately the same time, the 163d Tactical Reconnaissance Group also changed mission and became the 163rd Air Refueling Wing (163 ARW), operating the Boeing KC-135. On 1 April 1996, March officially became March Air Reserve Base under the Air Force Reserve Command (AFRC), ending a 78-year active duty military presence.

In 2005, the 452nd retired the venerable C-141 Starlifter and commenced transition to the C-17 Globemaster III as the first AFRC unit to operate the aircraft as an independent wing not associated with an active duty C-17 wing. March is currently home to nine C-17 Globemaster IIIs, which belong strictly to the Air Force Reserve Command, as well as twelve KC-135R Stratotankers. The tankers were the first in the Air Force Reserve to convert to the Block 40 Pacer CRAG modernization upgrade.

In 2007, the 163rd also saw a change in mission, transferring its KC-135R aircraft to other Air Force, Air Force Reserve and Air National Guard units, with the majority of its aircraft transferred to the 452 AMW at March. The unit was then redesignated as the 163d Reconnaissance Wing (163 RW), operating the MQ-1 Predator unmanned aerial system. With this change, the 163 RW also changed operational claiamncy from Air Mobility Command (AMC) to Air Combat Command (ACC).

In 2010, the 912th Air Refueling Squadron (912 ARS) was reactivated and assigned to March. An active duty squadron of the Regular Air Force and the Air Mobility Command (AMC), the 912 ARS will be part of the 452 AMW under the "Active Associate" concept, working in tandem with the Air Force Reserve Command's 336th Air Refueling Squadron and 452nd Maintenance Group, while remaining under the administrative control of the 92nd Air Refueling Wing (92 ARW) at Fairchild AFB, Washington. This is an example of Total Force Integration at work.

On July 31, 2015, the 4th Combat Camera Squadron was inactivated due to defense budget cuts. The 4th Combat Camera Squadron stood up at March in 1996 as the only combat camera squadron in the Air Force Reserve. The squadron documented more than 350 worldwide combat, humanitarian, expeditionary and training missions with still photography and video, both on the ground and aerial missions.

On January 20, 2017, the flight transporting Former President Barack Obama and his family after he left office was diverted to March after a storm shut off access to Palm Springs International Airport.

Later that year, the 1st Combat Camera Squadron Operating Location Charlie was established as an aerial combat camera unit to cover the PACAF area of responsibility. This active duty unit deployed to several locations during its time to include the CENTCOM AOR as well as AFRICOM AOR. This unit also provided video and photo coverage of the post battle damage assessment from the January 6th, 2020 attack from Al-Shabaab forces in Kenya. In September 30th, 2020, the unit was shut down and consolidated back to the 1st Combat Camera Squadron in South Carolina.

In early 2020, the base was used to screen 210 individuals who had been evacuated from China due to the COVID-19 pandemic.

In January 2022, March was proposed to get 12 KC-46 Pegasus refueling jets for the US Air Force Reserve, however, these will also be shared with at least one active duty unit, according to Rep. Ken Calvert, (R-Calif). “March is expected to begin operating the new aircraft in 2025 and the unit will be fully operational by 2027,” according to Sen. Dianne Feinstein, (D-Calif.)

Major commands to which assigned
 United States Army Air Service, 6 March 1918 – April 1923
 United States Army Air Corps, March 1927 – 1 March 1935
 General Headquarters (GHQ) Air Force, 1 March 1935 – 31 March 1941
 Fourth Air Force, 31 March 1941 – 13 April 1945
 Continental Air Forces, 13 April 1945 – 21 March 1946
 Strategic Air Command, 21 March 1946 – 1 April 1946
 Tactical Air Command, 1 April 1946 – 1 December 1948
 Continental Air Command, 1 December 1948 – 1 May 1949
 Strategic Air Command, 1 May 1949 – 1 June 1992
 Air Combat Command, 1 June 1992 – 30 June 1996
 Air Force Reserve Command, 1 July 1996–present

Major historical units assigned

United States Army Air Service (1918–1923)
 Det, 818th Aero Sq, 1 March 1918 – 22 July 1919
 9th Aero Squadron, 22 July – 11 December 1919
 23d Aero Squadron, 1 October 1921 – 21 March 1922
 19th Aero Squadron, 1 October 1921 – 29 June 1922

United States Army Air Corps (1927–1941)
 11th Bomb Squadron, 3 June – 31 July 1927
 95th Pursuit Squadron, 7 June – 31 July 1927
 44th Observation Squadron, 25 June – 31 July 1927
 13th School Group, 31 July 1927 – 30 April 1931
 7th Bombardment Group, 29 October 1931 – 4 December 1934
 17th Pursuit (Later Bombardment) Group, 15 July 1931 – 24 June 1940
 19th Bombardment Group, 25 October 1935 – 4 June 1941
 30th Bombardment Group, 15 January – 20 May 1941
 41st Bombardment Group, 15 January – 20 May 1941
 14th Pursuit Group, 10 June 1941 – 7 February 1942
 51st Pursuit Group, 10 June 1941 – 7 February 1942

United States Army Air Forces (1941–1947)
 30th Bombardment Group, 11 March 1942 – 28 September 1943
 20th Fighter Group, 4 January – 11 August 1943
 453rd Bombardment Group, 1 October – 2 December 1943
 479th Fighter Group, 28 October 1943 – 7 April 1944
 473d Fighter Group, 1 November 1943 – 31 March 1944
 399th Bombardment Group, 3 December 1943 – 31 March 1944
 420th Army Air Force Base Unit, 1 April 1944 – 9 April 1946

United States Air Force (1947–1996)

 1st Fighter Group, 1 April 1946 – 15 August 1947
 Established as: 1st Fighter Wing (later Fighter-Interceptor Wing), 15 August 1947 – 18 July 1950
 67th Tactical Reconnaissance Group, 25 July – 25 November 1947
 Established as: 67th Tactical Reconnaissance Wing, 25 November 1947 – 28 March 1949
 22d Bombardment Wing, 10 May 1949 – 1 October 1982
 Re-designated: 22d Air Refueling Wing, 1 October 1982 – 1 January 1994
 Fifteenth Air Force, 7 November 1949 – 1 January 1992
 330th Bombardment Wing, 25 June 1949 – 16 June 1951
 15th Air Force 7 November 1949 – 1 January 1992
 44th Bombardment Wing, 2 January – 1 August 1951

 12th Air Division, 10 February 1951 – 1 January 1962
 106th Bombardment Group, 28 March 1951 – 1 December 1952
 320th Bombardment Wing, 1 December 1952 – 15 December 1960
 452d Troop Carrier (later Military Airlift) Wing (AFRES), 1 November 1960 – 1 January 1972
 452d Tactical Airlift (later Air Refueling) Wing (AFRES), 1 January 1976 – 1 April 1994
 Southwest Air Defense Sector, 1 July 1987 – 31 December 1994
 445th Military Airlift Wing (AFRES), 30 March 1994 – 1 May 1994

United States Air Force Reserve (1996 – present)
 4th Combat Camera Squadron, 1 July 1996 – 31 July 2015

Airlines and destinations

Cargo

Possible redevelopment
The former March AFB land no longer needed as a result of the downsizing was given to the March Joint Powers Authority, a commission that represents the county and the base's adjoining cities. A prime example was the former SAC B-52 and KC-135 Alert Facility on the south end of the airfield. This land, now called March GlobalPort, has been developed as an air cargo center and in 2004 it was announced that air freight corporation DHL/ ABX Air was considering the base for its new Southern California hub. Competition from nearby San Bernardino International Airport (formerly Norton AFB) and Ontario International Airport, as well as opposition from residents of fast-growing Riverside and Moreno Valley, significantly reduced the viability of the March GlobalPort location. Yet despite this drawbacks, DHL / ABX Air announced on 10 December 2004 that it had chosen March as its preferred site. On 15 December 2004, DHL signed a 16-year joint-use agreement with the March Joint Powers Authority, with the company's operation expected to ultimately employ 250 to 300 workers and operate 16 cargo flights per day.

By November 2008, severe competition and a weakening global economy forced DHL to announce that it would close its March GlobalPort facility by early 2009 due to low profitability. This was part of a greater DHL business model which entailed completely shutting down all domestic shipping within the US. A new commercial tenant for the March GlobalPort facility has yet to be determined.

Additional proposals to convert March Air Reserve Base into a joint civil-military public use airport have also been a topic of discussion. However, multiple issues have continued to draw this proposal into question. An original plan had the March Joint Powers Authority signing an agreement to convert March into a joint-use civil-military airport, sharing facilities between the military, DHL and the public. However, DHL's recent retrenchment from their facility at March significantly impacted the viability of such a proposal. Conversion of March into a joint civil-military facility for general aviation beyond the USAF-operated March Aero Club, as well as possible regional airline operations, has also been the subject of public protest and debate due to the potential increase in noise pollution, interference with military operations and the lack of a definitive funding stream for expanded civilian flight operations at March ARB, to include ground traffic/transportation infrastructure and requisite TSA security enhancements.

Amazon Air added March ARB to its service toward the end of 2018, with up to six flights a day.

Geography
March ARB is located at  (33.898848, −117.276285).

The United States Census Bureau has designated the base as its own census-designated place for statistical purposes. It had a population of 1,159 at the 2010 census, up from 370 as of the 2000 census. The ZIP code is 92518 and the area code 951.

Demographics

2000
As of the census of 2000, there were 370 people, 115 households, and 93 families residing in the base. The racial makeup of the base was 64.6% White, 17.8% Black or African American, 0.5% Native American, 4.6% Asian, 1.9% Pacific Islander, 3.0% from other races, and 7.6% from two or more races. Hispanic or Latino people of any race were 11.9% of the population.

There were 115 households, out of which 50.4% had children under the age of 18 living with them, 66.1% were married couples living together, 13.0% had a female householder with no husband present, and 18.3% were non-families. 13.0% of all households were made up of individuals, and 2.6% had someone living alone who was 65 years of age or older. The average household size was 3.2 and the average family size was 3.6.

In the base the population was spread out, with 37.0% under the age of 18, 8.1% from 18 to 24, 35.1% from 25 to 44, 14.9% from 45 to 64, and 4.9% who were 65 years of age or older. The median age was 29 years. For every 100 females, there were 111.4 males. For every 100 females age 18 and over, there were 111.8 males.

The median income for a household in the base was $31,364, and the median income for a family was $30,455. Males had a median income of $40,625 versus $17,321 for females. The per capita income for the base was $13,765. About 10.8% of families and 13.1% of the population were below the poverty line, including 19.7% of those under age 18 and none of those age 65 or over.

2010
The 2010 United States Census reported that March ARB had a population of 1,159. The racial makeup of March ARB was 811 (70.0%) White (66.3% Non-Hispanic White), 171 (14.8%) African American, 10 (0.9%) Native American, 35 (3.0%) Asian, 2 (0.2%) Pacific Islander, 93 (8.0%) from other races, and 37 (3.2%) from two or more races. Hispanic or Latino people of any race were 172 persons (14.8%).

The Census reported that 1,011 people (87.2% of the population) lived in households, 110 (9.5%) lived in non-institutionalized group quarters, and 38 (3.3%) were institutionalized.

There were 563 households, out of which 91 (16.2%) had children under the age of 18 living in them, 196 (34.8%) were opposite-sex married couples living together, 61 (10.8%) had a female householder with no husband present, 11 (2.0%) had a male householder with no wife present. There were 5 (0.9%) unmarried opposite-sex partnerships, and 2 (0.4%) same-sex married couples or partnerships. 273 households (48.5%) were made up of individuals, and 214 (38.0%) had someone living alone who was 65 years of age or older. The average household size was 1.80. There were 268 families (47.6% of all households); the average family size was 2.55.

The population was spread out, with 156 people (13.5%) under the age of 18, 36 people (3.1%) aged 18 to 24, 155 people (13.4%) aged 25 to 44, 246 people (21.2%) aged 45 to 64, and 566 people (48.8%) who were 65 years of age or older. The median age was 63.0 years. For every 100 females, there were 106.2 males. For every 100 females age 18 and over, there were 103.4 males.

The homeowner vacancy rate was 2.4%; the rental vacancy rate was 17.4%. 119 people (10.3% of the population) lived in owner-occupied housing units and 892 people (77.0%) lived in rental housing units.

Politics

See also

 Western Air Defense Force (Air Defense Command)
 California World War II Army Airfields
 March Field Air Museum is located adjacent to but off the grounds of March ARB and displays in its aircraft collection examples bombers, fighters, cargo, refueling and reconnaissance aircraft, many of which served at March Field, March AFB and/or March ARB.
 Riverside National Cemetery is a military cemetery located west of the base and created from land formerly belonging to the base. It is home to one of the four U.S.-recognized Medal of Honor memorial sites.
 List of Training Section Air Service airfields

Footnotes

References
 
 Martin, Patrick (1994). Tail Code: The Complete History of USAF Tactical Aircraft Tail Code Markings. Schiffer Military Aviation History. .
 
 Menard, David W. (1998) Before Centuries: USAFE Fighters, 1948–1959. Howell Press Inc. 
 
 
 
 USAAS-USAAC-USAAF-USAF Aircraft Serial Numbers – 1908 to present

Attribution

External links

 

 
  [entry date: 1999]
  [entry date: 2011]
  [entry date: 2008]
  [entry date: 2008]

Installations of the United States Air Force in California
Installations of Strategic Air Command
Installations of the United States Air National Guard
Initial United States Air Force installations
Airports in Riverside County, California
Moreno Valley, California
Military in Riverside County, California
Census-designated places in Riverside County, California
Military Superfund sites
Superfund sites in California
World War I airfields in the United States
1918 establishments in California